Hilobothea latevittata is a species of beetle in the family Cerambycidae. It was described by Bates in 1865. It is known from Brazil, Ecuador, Guiana, French Guiana, and Suriname.

References

Colobotheini
Beetles described in 1865